Bergamo is an Italian surname. Notable people with the surname include:

 Almiro Bergamo (1912–1994), Italian rower
 Augie Bergamo (1917–1974), American baseball player
 Petar Bergamo (1930–2022), Yugoslav composer
 John Bergamo (1940–2013), American percussionist and composer
 Paolo Bergamo (born 1943), Italian football referee
 Rodolfo Bergamo (born 1955), Italian high jumper

Italian-language surnames